Brazil had an official resident population of 215,000,000 in 2022, according to IBGE. Brazil is the seventh most populous country in the world, and the second most populous in the Americas and Western Hemisphere.

Brazilians are mainly concentrated in the eastern part of the country, which comprises the Southeast, South and Northeast. But it also has a significant presence in large cities in the Center-West and North. According with 2010 Census, Brazil had 91,051,646 White people, 82,277,333 Mixed people, 14,517,961 Black people, 2,084,288 Asian people, and 817,963 Indigenous people.

Demographic statistics

Demographic statistics according to the World Population Review.

One birth every 11 seconds	
One death every 24 seconds	
One net migrant every 90 minutes	
Net gain of one person every 20 seconds

Demographic statistics according to the CIA World Factbook, unless otherwise indicated.

Age structure 
0-14 years: 21.11% (male 22,790,634/female 21,907,018)
15-24 years: 16.06% (male 17,254,363/female 16,750,581)
25-54 years: 43.83% (male 46,070,240/female 46,729,640)
55-64 years: 9.78% (male 9,802,995/female 10,911,140)
65 years and over: 9.21% (male 8,323,344/female 11,176,018) (2020 est.)

Median age 
total: 33.2 years
male: 32.3 years
female: 34.1 years (2020 est.)

Total fertility rate 
1.73 children born/woman (2021 est.)

Population
213,445,417 (July 2021 est.)

Population growth rate 
0.65% (2021 est.)

Birth rate: 
13.44 births/1,000 population (2021 est.)

Death rate
6.8 deaths/1,000 population (2021 est.)

Net migration rate 
-0.13 migrant(s)/1,000 population (2021 est.)

Life expectancy at birth
total population: 74.98 years
male: 71.49 years
female: 78.65 years (2021 est.)

Languages
Portuguese (official and most widely spoken language)
Libras (Brazilian Sign Language)
note: less common languages include Spanish (border areas and schools), German, Italian, Japanese, English, and a large number of minor Amerindian languages

Religions
Roman Catholic 64.6%, other Catholic 0.4%, Protestant 22.2% (includes Adventist 6.5%, Assembly of God 2.0%, Christian Congregation of Brazil 1.2%, Universal Kingdom of God 1.0%, other Protestant 11.5%), other Christian 0.7%, Spiritist 2.2%, other 1.4%, none 8%, unspecified 0.4% (2010 est.)

Dependency ratios
total dependency ratio: 43.5
youth dependency ratio: 29.7
elderly dependency ratio: 13.8
potential support ratio: 7.3 (2020 est.)

Population

According to the 2008 PNAD (National Household Sample Survey), conducted by the IBGE, the Brazilian Statistics bureau, there were about 189,953,000 inhabitants in 2008. As of the latest (2010) census, the Brazilian government estimates its population at 192.76 million.

The population of Brazil is estimated based on various sources from 1550 to 1850. The first official census took place in 1873. From that year, every 8 years (with some exceptions) the population is counted. The Instituto Brasileiro de Geografia e Estatistica has postponed the next census until 2021 due to the COVID-19 pandemic.

Brazil is the seventh most populated country in the world.

 1550 – 15,000
 1600 – 100,000
 1660 – 184,000
 1700 – 300,000
 1766 – 1,500,000
 1800 – 3,250,000
 1820 – 4,717,000
 1850 – 7,256,000
 1872 – 9,930,478
 1890 – 14,333,915
 1900 – 17,438,434
 1920 – 30,635,605
 1940 – 41,236,315
 1950 – 51,944,397
 1960 – 70,119,071
 1970 – 93,139,037
 1980 – 119,070,865
 1991 – 146,917,459
 1996 – 157,079,573
 2000 – 169,544,443
 2010 – 192,755,799
  – 

Population distribution in Brazil is very uneven. The majority of Brazilians live within  of the coast, while the interior in the Amazon Basin is highly remote. Therefore, the densely populated areas are on the coast and the sparsely populated areas are in the interior.

UN estimates
The proportion of children below the age of 15 in 2015 was 20.7%, 69.8% was between 15 and 61 years of age, while 9.5% was 65 years or older.

Vital statistics

Total fertility rate from 1940 to 1990 
The total fertility rate is the number of children born per woman. It is based on fairly good data for the entire period. Sources: Our World In Data and Gapminder Foundation.

Registration of vital events in Brazil has considerably improved during the past decades but is still not considered complete, especially in the northern part of the country. The Population Division of the United Nations prepared the following estimates and forecasts.

Births and deaths

Current vital statistics

Deaths from January – November 2021 =  1,727,424
Deaths from January – November 2022 =  1,442,713

Regional and racial differences

In some states in the North and Northeast, the fertility rate was higher than the national average in 2015. The highest rate was in Acre, with 2.35 children per woman. Other regions with high fertility include Amapá, with 2.28 children per woman, Amazonas, 2.25 in Roraima, 2.22, in Maranhão, 2.17, and Pará, 2.13.

On the other hand, São Paulo is the state with the lowest rate, 1.38 children per woman. Other states with low fertility include Santa Catarina, with 1.45, Rio Grande do Sul, 1.50, in Rio de Janeiro, 1.55 in Paraná and Minas Gerais, 1.59.

Regarding race of mothers, between 2001 and 2015, the fertility rate of all racial groups fell below replacement rate. Black fertility fell from 2.75 to 1.88, Pardo/Mixed fertility fell from 2.65 to 1.96 and white fertility fell from 2.10 to 1.69. There was no information regarding Asian fertility rates. Indigenous fertility was calculated at 3.87 children per women in 2010.

Childlessness and education

The color or race of the woman and the level of education has also shown to influence the fact of not having children. In 2013, among European women aged 15 to 49 years, 41.5% had no children, while among African women, the percentage was 35.8%.

The proportional difference is even greater among European women compared to African 25–29 years. While the proportion among European women childless was 48.1% among African women was 33.8%.

Regarding education, among women 15–49 years of age with more than eight years of schooling, 44.2% had no children in 2013, while among those with up to seven years of study this figure was 21.6%.

Schooling among women 25–29 years has shown an even greater disparity. Among the less educated, 16.3% had no children, while among the more educated 54.5% had no children. The proportion of women aged 45 to 49 without children was 8.2% in 2013 among those with less education and 15.1% among those with more years of schooling.

Total fertility rate 
1.78 children born/woman (IBGE 2015 est.)

Urbanization 
In Brazil, most important cities are on the coast or close to it. State capitals are also, commonly, the largest city of their states. Notable exceptions to this are Vitória, the capital of Espírito Santo, and Florianópolis, the capital of Santa Catarina.

There are also non-capital metropolitan areas, for example, in São Paulo state (Campinas, Santos, Paraíba Valley, Sorocaba, Ribeirão Preto and Franca), Minas Gerais (Steel Valley), Rio Grande do Sul (Sinos Valley), and Santa Catarina (Itajaí Valley), amongst others.

São Paulo and Rio de Janeiro are far larger than any other Brazilian cities. São Paulo's influence in most economic aspects can be noted in a national (and even international) scale;  Rio de Janeiro – partially due to its former status as the national capital – still host various large corporations' headquarters, besides being Brazil's cultural center with respect to film production and other such televised media. Brasília, the capital of Brazil, is its 3rd biggest city.

Migrations

Immigration

Immigration has been a very important demographic factor in the formation, structure and history of the population in Brazil, influencing culture, economy, education, racial issues, etc. Brazil has received the third largest number of immigrants in the Western Hemisphere.

Brazil's structure, legislation and settlement policies for arriving immigrants were much less organized than in Canada and the United States at the time. Nevertheless, an Immigrant Inn (Hospedaria dos Imigrantes) was built in 1886 in São Paulo, and quick admittance and recording routines for the throngs of immigrants arriving by ship at the seaports of Vitória, Rio de Janeiro, Santos, Paranaguá, Florianópolis and Porto Alegre were established. The São Paulo State alone processed more than 2.5 million immigrants in its almost 100 years of continuous operation. People of more than 70 different nationalities were recorded.

Following the trend of several other countries in the Americas, which encouraged immigration from many countries, Brazil quickly became a melting pot of races and nationalities, but being peculiar in the sense of having the highest degree of intermarriage in the world. Immigrants found a strong social and cultural tolerance toward inter-racial marriage, including large numbers of Mulattoes (European and African), Caboclos (Indian and European) and mixed European, African and Indian people, though it was not accompanied by an entire lack of racism. Correspondingly, the same mentality reflected in low psychological and social barriers regarding intermarriage between Europeans, Middle Easterners and Asians of several origins, as well as between people of different religions.

History of immigration
It is postulated that the Americas were settled by three migratory waves from Northern Asia. The Native Brazilians are thought to descend from the first wave of migrants, who arrived in the region around 9000 BC. The main Native Brazilian groups are the Tupi-Guarani, the Jê, the Arawaks and the Caraibas (Kalina or Caribs). The Tupi-Guarani nation, originally from the Paraná river basin and also one of the largest of the Native-Paraguayan nations, had spread all along the Brazilian coastline from South to North and came to be known by the Portuguese as "Os Índios da Língua Geral" ("The Indians of the General Language"); the Jê nation occupied most of the interior of the country from Maranhão to Santa Catarina. The Arawaks and the Caribs, the last ones to get in contact with the Portuguese, lived in the North and Northwest of Brazil.

The European immigration to Brazil started in the 16th century, with the vast majority of them coming from Portugal. In the first two centuries of colonization, 100,000 Portuguese arrived in Brazil (around 500 colonists per year). In the 18th century, 600,000 Portuguese arrived (6,000 per year). The first region to be settled by the Portuguese was Northeastern Brazil, followed by the Southeast region. The original Amerindian population of Brazil (between two and five million) largely died from disease or violence or was assimilated into the Portuguese population. The Mamelucos (or Caboclos, a mixed race between Europeans and Amerindians) have always been present in many parts of Brazil.

Another important ethnic group, Africans, first arrived as slaves. Many came from Guinea-Bissau, or from West African countries – by the end of the eighteenth century many had been taken from the Kingdom of Kongo and modern-day Angola, Congo, Mozambique, Benin and Nigeria. By the time of the end of the slave trade in 1850, around six million slaves had been brought to Brazil–50% of all slave traffic between Africa and the Americas. Nowadays, there are still small immigration waves coming from the African continent.
The largest influx of European immigrants to Brazil occurred in the late 19th and early 20th centuries. According to the Memorial do Imigrante statistics data, Brazil attracted nearly 5 million immigrants between 1870 and 1953.

These immigrants were divided in two groups: a part of them was sent to Southern Brazil to work as small farmers. However, the biggest part of the immigrants was sent to Southeast Brazil to work in the coffee plantations. The immigrants sent to Southern Brazil were mainly Germans (starting in 1824, mainly from Rhineland-Palatinate, Pomerania, Hamburg, Westphalia, etc.) Italians (starting in 1875, mainly from the Veneto and Lombardia), Austrians, Poles, Ukrainians, Dutch and Russians. In the South, the immigrants established rural communities that retain a cultural connection with their ancestral homelands. In Southeast Brazil, most of the immigrants were Italians (mainly from the Veneto, Campania, Calabria and Lombardia), Portuguese (mainly from Beira Alta, Minho and Alto Trás-os-Montes), Dutch, Spaniards (mainly from Galicia and Andalusia), Lithuanians, French, Hungarians and Ashkenazi Jews.

Notably, the first half of the 20th century saw a large inflow of Japanese (mainly from Honshū, Hokkaidō and Okinawa) and Levantine Christians from Lebanon (and few from Syria). These Christian Levantine immigrants were wrongly called "Turks" by many Brazilians because their original countries were still under Ottoman rule back in the period when their immigration to Brazil began. The number of actual Turks who immigrated to Brazil was in fact very small. Chinese, Taiwanese and Koreans influx became common after the 1950s.

IBGE's 1998 PME
On the other hand, in 1998, the IBGE, within its preparation for the 2000 Census, experimentally introduced a question about "origem" (origin/ancestry) in its "Pesquisa Mensal de Emprego" (Monthly Employment Research), to test the viability of introducing that variable in the Census (the IBGE ended by deciding against the inclusion of questions about it in the Census). This research interviewed about 90,000 people in six metropolitan regions (São Paulo, Rio de Janeiro, Porto Alegre, Belo Horizonte, Salvador, and Recife). To this day, it remains the only actual published survey about the immigrant origin of Brazilians.

Here are its results:

Notice that the total is higher than 100% because of multiple answers. Many Brazilians are unaware of their ancestry, especially those of old immigration, due to this the high number who declared themselves only as Brazilians.

Emigration
In the second half of the 1980s, Brazilians from various socioeconomic levels started to emigrate to other countries in search of economic opportunities.

In the 1990s, nearly 1.9 million Brazilians were living outside the country, mainly in the United States, Paraguay and Japan, but also in Italy, Portugal, the United Kingdom, France, Canada, Australia, Switzerland, Germany, Belgium, Spain and Israel. However, there were no specific policies implemented by the government to encourage or discourage this emigration process.

The 2000 Brazilian Census provides some information about the high number of migrants returning to Brazil. Of those who reported residing in another country less than 10 years before the 2000 census, 66.9 percent were Brazilians. If only the returning migrants (former Brazilian immigrants) are considered, 26.8 percent of Brazilians came from Paraguay, 17 percent came from Japan, and 15.8 percent came from the United States.

Racial composition

The bulk of the Brazilian population descends from three main source populations (either alone, or more commonly, in varying combinations mixed in varying degrees); early European settlers (chiefly ethnic Portuguese, but also Portuguese New Christians of ethnic Sephardic Jewish origin forced to convert to Christianity), sub-Saharan Africans (Yoruba, Ewe, Akan, Bantu, and others), and the indigenous peoples in Brazil (mostly Tupi and Guarani, but also many other indigenous Brazilian ethnic groups).

Starting in the late 19th century, Brazil received substantial post-colonial immigration from several other regions, mainly from peoples of what are now the countries of Italy, Germany, Spain, Poland, as well as Middle-Eastern Christians from the Levant (mostly from what is now Lebanon, and less so from Syria), Ukraine, Japan, China and Korea.

Jews in Brazil are a small but sizable population, and they include mostly Ashkenazi Jews (who also arrived with the post-colonial contingent of European migration), a smaller proportion of Sephardi Jews (mostly Eastern Sephardim arrived with the contingent of post-colonial immigrants from Syria and Lebanon, but also North African Sephardim from Morocco settled in the Amazon, and Western Sephardim arrived with the Dutch), and to a much lesser extent Mizrahi Jews.

Overall, the small but sizable Brazilian Jewish community is concentrated especially in São Paulo, Rio de Janeiro and Porto Alegre, and they are accounted for without Brazilian descendants of Portuguese "New Christians" (ethnic Sephardic Jews forced to convert to Christianity and arrived with the ethnic Portuguese during the colonial period), which if included would inflate the Jewish origin population in Brazil considerably.  By themselves, Brazilian descendants of Portuguese "New Christians" are estimated to account for a figure anywhere between hundreds of thousands to several million.

The descendants of European immigrants, particularly the Germans, Italians, Austrians, Swiss, Poles, Ukrainians, French, Dutch, Lithuanians, Scandinavians, Russians, Hungarians, Finns and Luxembourgers are mainly concentrated in the southern part of the country, in the states of Rio Grande do Sul, Santa Catarina, Paraná, and the most populous, São Paulo; these states have a wide majority of citizens of European descent.
São Paulo alone has the largest population in absolute numbers with 30 million Europeans.

In the rest of the country, part of the European-Brazilian population is of colonial Portuguese, Dutch, Spanish and French settler stock, especially in the Northeast. In the mid-southern states of Rio de Janeiro, Espírito Santo, Minas Gerais, Goiás, Mato Grosso do Sul and in the Federal District, the number of Europeans (European and Levantine phenotype) revolves around 50% of the population or above, being close to the proportion of people of Mixed-race Brazilians, and other minorities like Black Brazilians and East Asian Brazilians.

In the Northeast, which received large masses of African slaves to work in sugarcane, tobacco and cotton plantations, people of African and mixed-race descent predominate, mostly on the coast, whereas in the semi-arid country land (usually called sertão) there is a predominance of Europeans and Amerindian-European mixed people. Most of the African or mulatto people in the sertão are descended from freed African slaves or mulattos who fled inland from the coast and worked as cowboys for semi-feudal lords.

The city of Salvador da Bahia is considered one of the largest African cities of the world. In the Northwest (covering largely the Brazilian Amazon), a great part of the population has distinguishable ethnic characteristics that emphasize their Amerindian roots. Other ethnic groups have merged with the Indigenous tribes there. This region is not densely populated, and "caboclos", people of mixed native and European descent, are a small part of the entire Brazilian population.

The Japanese are the largest Asian group in Brazil. In fact, Brazil has the largest population of Japanese ancestry outside Japan, with 1.8 million Japanese Brazilians, most of them living in São Paulo. Some Chinese and Korean also settled Brazil. Most Chinese came from mainland China, but others came from Taiwan and Hong Kong, and also from Portuguese-speaking Macau—these Chinese from Macau could speak and understand Portuguese, and it was not hard for them to adjust to Brazilian life.

Those immigrant populations and their descendants still retain some of their original ethnic identity, however they are not closed communities and are rapidly integrating into mainstream Brazilian society: for instance, very few of the third generation can understand their grandparents' languages.

European-Brazilians

According to the 2010 census, there were more than 91 million European-Brazilians, comprising 47.73% of Brazil's population. European-Brazilians are defined as people who are solely or mostly descended from European immigrants, although most Brazilians have some degree of European ancestry. Europeans are found in the entire territory of Brazil, although they are most concentrated in the south and southeastern parts of the country. 

A survey conducted in 1998 by the Minas Gerais sociologist Simon Schwartzman interviewed about 34 million Brazilians, of whom nearly 20 million declared themselves white. Asked the ethnic origin of the participants of white race, a plurality pointed only Brazilian origin (45.53%).

More than half, however, managed to point to a foreign origin: 15.72% indicated Portuguese ancestry, 14.50% Italian, 6.42% Spanish, 5.51% German and 12.32% other origins, which include Polish, Ukrainian, Russian, Lithuanian, Dutch, Austrian, Swiss, French, Hungarian, Norwegian, partial distant African, indigenous, British, American Confederate, Jewish (mostly Ashkenazi, but also Sephardi including Jews from Morocco and Egypt) and Christian Levantine (Lebanese).

Nearly one million Europeans had arrived in Brazil by 1800; most of them colonists from Portugal. An immigration boom occurred in the 19th and 20th centuries, when nearly six million Europeans emigrated to Brazil, most of them Portuguese, Germans, Italians and Spaniards.

Many European-Brazilians have some Amerindian and/or African ancestry (similarly found in European-Americans and European-Argentines). It is estimated that 75% of all Brazilians have varying degrees of Portuguese ancestry.

Nowadays, European-Brazilians come from a very diverse background, which includes:

The Dutch were among the Europeans settling in Brazil during the 17th century. From 1630 to 1654, the Dutch controlled the northeast coast of Brazil, establishing their colonial capital in Recife. During the 19th and 20th century, immigrants from the Netherlands populated the central and southern states of Brazil. The first Dutch immigrants to South America after its independence waves from their metropoles went to the Brazilian state of Espírito Santo between 1858 and 1862, where they founded the settlement of Holanda, a colony of 500 mainly Reformed folk from West Zeelandic Flanders in the Dutch province of Zeeland. Dutch and other Low Franconian languages are still spoken in São Paulo (state), especially Holambra (named after Holland-America-Brazil), famous for its tulips and the annual Expoflora event, Santa Catarina, Rio Grande do Sul and around Ponta Grossa, Castrolanda and Carambeí known as little Holland, in the plains of Paraná, headquarters of several food companies and a dairy farming region.
The first Germans and Austrians arrived in Brazil in 1824. Most of them established themselves in rural communities across Southern Brazil, such as São Leopoldo, Novo Hamburgo, Blumenau and Pomerode. In Santa Catarina state, Southern Brazil, Germans and Austrians represented over 45% of all immigrants arriving, and in the entire country, citizens who descend from German-speaking nationalities, including Swiss and Luxemburger, but also Volga German, may represent as much as 8% of the absolute population, since Brazil is home to the second largest German-Austrian population outside their respective nations, after the USA. And German is the second most spoken mother tongue in the country. According to Ethnologue, Standard German is spoken by 1.5 million people and Brazilian German encompass assorted dialects, including Riograndenser Hunsrückisch spoken by over 3 million Brazilians.
Italians started arriving in Brazil in 1875, making up the main group of immigrants in the late 19th century. First they settled in rural communities across Southern Brazil. In the early 20th century, they mostly settled in the coffee plantations in the Southeast, later moving to São Paulo capital to work in factories or starting their own businesses in trade, services and industry like businessman and industrialist count Francesco Matarazzo. In São Paulo, which came to be labeled an "Italian city" in the early twentieth century, Italians engaged mainly in the incipient industry and urban services activities. They came to represent 60% of the 60,000 workers employed in São Paulo factories in 1901. 11% of Brazilians or 20 million citizens are of Italian extraction, possibly the largest number outside of Italy itself, most of them descended from Northern Italians, reason why Talian, or the Venetian dialect, is the third most spoken mother tongue in the nation.
Poles came in significant numbers to Brazil after 1870. Most of them settled in the State of Paraná, working as small farmers.
Portuguese Most Brazilians are fully or partly of Portuguese ancestry. Portuguese settlers began arriving in 1500. Immigration increased during the 18th century and reached its peak in the late 19th and early 20th centuries. Lusitanian immigration never ceased throughout the 19th and 20th centuries. Portuguese people in diaspora settled in Brazil especially during the 1970s coming from former Portuguese colonies like Macau or Angola after its independence. The Portuguese were always the largest ethnic group of immigrants to Brazil. In the early years of Portuguese colonization it is estimated that between 1500 – 1800 some 600,000 Portuguese immigrated to Brazil, and then between 1800 – 1980 another 600,000, then from 1980 to the present, 600,000 more. Portuguese immigration to Brazil will always be a constant, hence, will always comprise the largest percentage of European immigrants. By 2030, there will be an estimated 1,000,000 Portuguese total immigrants in Brazil as of 1980, significantly dwarfing all of the other immigrant groups. An additional figure of 1.2 million Portuguese arrived between 1951 and 1975 to settle mostly in the Southeast. Nowadays, Lusitanians (Portuguese) constitute the biggest group of foreigners living in the country, with over 700,000 Portuguese nationals currently living in Brazil. The vast majority arrived in the last decade. The first semester of 2011 solely had an increase of 52 thousand Portuguese nationals applying for a permanent residence visa while another large group was granted Brazilian citizenship.
Spaniards came in large numbers to Brazil, starting in the late 19th century. Most of them were attracted to work in the coffee plantations in the state of São Paulo. An estimated 15 million Brazilians are of direct Spanish descent.
Ukrainians came mostly in the late 19th century. Currently they number approximately 980,000, most of whom live in a compact settlement in south central Paraná.

Mixed-race/Pardo-Brazilians

The Pardos can be a mixture of Europeans, Levantine, Crypto-Jews or Anusim, Africans, Amerindians, Roma and Asians. Brazil does not have a category for multiracial people, but a Pardo (brown) one, which may include caboclos, mulatos, cafuzos (local ethnonyms for people of noticeable mixed European and Amerindian, African and European, and Amerindian and African descent, i.e., mestizos, mulattoes and zambos, respectively), the multiracial result of their intermixing (despite most of European and African Brazilians possessing some degree of race-mixing, since brownness in Brazil is a matter of phenotype) and assimilated, westernized indigenous people.

The Pardos make up 43.13% or 82.3 million people of Brazil's population. Multiracial Brazilians live in the entire territory of Brazil. Although, according to DNA resources, most Brazilians possess some degree of mixed-race ancestry, less than 45% of the country's population classified themselves as being part of this group due to phenotype.

The caboclo or mestiço population, those whose ancestry is Native and European, revolves around 43 million people or 21% of the population. Genetic studies conducted by the geneticist Sergio D.J. Pena of the Federal University of Minas Gerais have shown that the caboclo population is made of individuals whose DNA ranges from 70% to 90% European (mostly Portuguese, Spanish, Dutch, French or Italian 1500s to 1700s male settlers) with the remaining percentage spanning different Indigenous markers.

Similar DNA tests showed that people self-classified as mulatto or European and African mix, span from 62% to 83% European (mostly descendants of Portuguese, Dutch and French settlers during the colonial period in the Northeast). The pardo category in Brazil also includes 800 thousand Roma people, most of them coming from Portugal but also different countries in Eastern Europe and the Baltics. Eurasians can also be classified as pardo. The majority of them consisting of Ainoko or Hafu, individuals of Japanese and European ancestry.

Research has suggested that Asians from the early Portuguese Eastern Empire, known as Luso-Asians first came to Brazil during the sixteenth century as seamen known as Lascars, or as servants, slaves and concubines accompanying the governors, merchants and clergy who has served in Portuguese Asia. This first presence of Asians was limited to Northeast Brazil, especially Bahia, but others were brought as cultivators, textile workers and miners to Pará and other parts of the Northeast.

African-Brazilians

African-Brazilians are defined as people who are solely, or mostly, descended from former African slaves, or immigrants. According to the 2010 census, there are 14,517,961 Black Brazilians, about 7.6% of the population.

Although the majority of Brazilians have at least some degree of African heritage, the racial makeup of black Brazilians themselves is very mixed and mostly of them have a significant degree of white admixture with a minor indigenous component, the range of white admixture for Afro-Brazilians is typically between 30% to 70%; "pure" black Brazilians with more than 80% of their genes coming from African ancestry are a subgroup minority.

Asian-Brazilians

According to the 2006 census, people of East Asian descent number 1,919,000, or 1.1% of Brazil's population. Estimates say that there are 2.5 to 3.0 million people of Japanese descent in Brazil, who are mostly concentrated in two states: São Paulo and Paraná, but smaller communities are found in the entire territory of the country. Brazil has the largest population of Japanese descent outside Japan.

There are also smaller communities of Korean people and Chinese origin. Some Chinese, especially from Macau, speak a Portuguese-based creole language called Macanese (patuá or macaísta), aside from Hakka, Mandarin and Cantonese. Japanese immigration to Brazil started on 18 June 1908, when the Japanese ship Kasato-Maru arrived in the Port of Santos, south of São Paulo, carrying the first 781 people to take advantage of a bilateral agreement promoting immigration.

Half of them were from the southern part of the Okinawa Island, located about 640 km (400 miles) south of the rest of Japan, which had its own distinct language and culture dating back to before the island's annexation by Tokyo in 1879. The names on shop fronts are in Japanese and selling everything from Japanese food and kitchen utensils to traditional home decorations. Red painted archways, Japanese temples and a Japanese garden are present in this little Japanese corner of Brazil.

Aboriginal-Brazilians

The Amerindians make up 0.4% of Brazil's population, or about 700,000 people. Indigenous peoples are found in the entire territory of Brazil, although the majority of them live in Indian reservations in the North and Centre-Western part of the country. Over 60 million Brazilians possess at least one Native South American ancestor, according to a mitochondrial DNA study.

However, only 0.4% of the population consider themselves to be Natives. Brazilians tend to consider "Native South American" a cultural, not racial category. When the first Portuguese arrived in Brazil, in 1500, there were between 2.5 and 3.2 million Natives living in the country. In the mid-19th century they were only 100,000 and in the late 20th century close to 300,000.

Genetic studies 
Genetic studies have shown the Brazilian population as a whole to have European, African and Native American components.

Autosomal DNA studies
A 2015 autosomal DNA genetic study, which also analysed data of 25 studies of 38 different Brazilian populations concluded that: European ancestry accounts for 62% of the heritage of the population, followed by the African (21%) and the Native American (17%). The European contribution is highest in Southern Brazil (77%), the African highest in Northeast Brazil (27%) and the Native American is the highest in Northern Brazil (32%).

An autosomal DNA study (2011), with nearly 1000 samples from every major race group ("whites", "pardos" and "blacks", according to their respective proportions) all over the country found out a major European contribution, followed by a high African contribution and an important Native American component.

"In all regions studied, the European ancestry was predominant, with proportions ranging from 60.6% in the Northeast to 77.7% in the South". The 2011 autosomal study samples came from blood donors (the lowest classes constitute the great majority of blood donors in Brazil), and also public health institutions personnel and health students.

An autosomal study from 2013, with nearly 1300 samples from all of the Brazilian regions, found a predominant degree of European ancestry combined with African and Native American contributions, in varying degrees. 'Following an increasing North to South gradient, European ancestry was the most prevalent in all urban populations (with values up to 74%). The populations in the North consisted of a significant proportion of Native American ancestry that was about two times higher than the African contribution. Conversely, in the Northeast, Center-West and Southeast, African ancestry was the second most prevalent. At an intrapopulation level, all urban
populations were highly admixed, and most of the variation in ancestry proportions was observed between individuals within each population rather than among population'.

An autosomal DNA study from 2009 found a similar profile: "all the Brazilian samples (regions) lie more closely to the European group than to the African populations or to the Mestizos from Mexico".

A 2015 autosomal genetic study, which also analysed data of 25 studies of 38 different Brazilian populations concluded that: European ancestry accounts for 62% of the heritage of the population, followed by the African (21%) and the Native American (17%). The European contribution is highest in Southern Brazil (77%), the African highest in Northeast Brazil (27%) and the Native American is the highest in Northern Brazil (32%).

Pairwise estimates of F(st) among the five Brazilian geopolitical regions suggested little genetic differentiation only between the South and the remaining regions. Estimates of ancestry results are consistent with the heterogeneous genetic profile of Brazilian population, with a major contribution of European ancestry (0.771) followed by African (0.143) and Amerindian contributions (0.085). The described multiplexed SNP panels can be useful tool for bioanthropological studies but it can be mainly valuable to control for spurious results in genetic association studies in admixed populations".

According to another autosomal DNA study from 2008, by the University of Brasília (UnB), European ancestry dominates in the whole of Brazil (in all regions), accounting for 65.90% of heritage of the population, followed by the African contribution (24.80%) and the Native American (9.3%).

São Paulo state, the most populous state in Brazil, with about 40 million people, showed the following composition, according to an autosomal study from 2006: European genes account for 79% of the heritage of the people of São Paulo, 14% are of African origin, and 7% Native American. A study from 2013 found the following composition in São Paulo state: 61.9% European, 25.5% African and 11.6% Native American. Another study focused on highly admixed populations yielded similar results.

Races and ethnicities by region

South

The South of Brazil is the region with the largest percentage of Europeans. According to the 2005 census, people of European ancestry account for 79.6% of the population. In colonial times, this region had a very small population.

The region what is now Southern Brazil was originally settled by Amerindian peoples, mostly Guarani and Kaingangs. Only a few settlers from São Paulo were living there. This situation made the region vulnerable to attacks from neighboring countries. This fact forced the King of Portugal to decide to populate the region. For this, settlers from the Portuguese Azores islands were sent to the coast in 1617.

To stimulate the immigration to Brazil, the king offered several benefits for the Azorean couples. Between 1748 and 1756, six thousand Portuguese from the Azores moved to the coast of Santa Catarina. They were mainly newly married who were seeking a better life. At that time, the Azores were one of the poorest regions of Portugal.

They established themselves mainly in the Santa Catarina Island, nowadays the region of Florianópolis. Later, some couples moved to Rio Grande do Sul, where they established Porto Alegre, the capital. The Azoreans lived on fishing and agriculture, especially flour. They composed over half of Rio Grande do Sul and Santa Catarina's population in the late 18th century. The state of Paraná was settled by colonists from São Paulo due to their proximity (Paraná was part of São Paulo until the mid-19th century).

With the development of cattle in the interior of Rio Grande do Sul, African slaves began arriving in large numbers. By 1822, Africans were 50% of Rio Grande do Sul's population. This number decreased to 25% in 1858 and to only 5.2% in 2005. Most of them came from Angola.

After independence from Portugal (1822) the Brazilian government started to stimulate the arrival of a new wave of immigrants to settle the South. In 1824 they established São Leopoldo, a German community. Major Schaeffer, a German who was living in Brazil, was sent to Germany in order to bring immigrants. From Rhineland-Palatinate, the Major brought the immigrants and soldiers. Settlers from Germany were brought to work as small farmers, because there were many land holdings without workers.

To attract the immigrants, the Brazilian government had promised large tracts of land, where they could settle with their families and colonize the region. The first years were not easy. Many Germans died of tropical disease, while others left the colonies to find better living conditions. The German colony of São Leopoldo was a disaster. Nevertheless, in the following years, a further 4,830 Germans arrived at São Leopoldo, and then the colony started to develop, with the immigrants establishing the town of Novo Hamburgo (New Hamburg).

From São Leopoldo and Novo Hamburgo, the German immigrants spread into others areas of Rio Grande do Sul, mainly close to sources of rivers. The whole region of Vale dos Sinos was populated by Germans. During the 1830s and part of the 1840s German immigration to Brazil was interrupted due to conflicts in the country (Ragamuffin War). The immigration restarted after 1845 with the creation of new colonies. The most important ones were Blumenau, in 1850, and Joinville in 1851, both in Santa Catarina state; these attracted thousands of German immigrants to the region.
In the next five decades, other 28 thousand Germans were brought to Rio Grande do Sul to work as small farmers in the countryside. By 1914, it is estimated that 50 thousand Germans settled in this state.

Another immigration boom to this region started in 1875. Communities with Italian immigrants were also created in southern Brazil. The first colonies to be populated by Italians were created in the highlands of Rio Grande do Sul (Serra Gaúcha). These were Garibaldi and Bento Gonçalves. These immigrants were predominantly from Veneto, in northern Italy. After five years, in 1880, the great numbers of Italian immigrants arriving caused the Brazilian government to create another Italian colony, Caxias do Sul. After initially settling in the government-promoted colonies, many of the Italian immigrants spread themselves into other areas of Rio Grande do Sul seeking further opportunities.

They created many other Italian colonies on their own, mainly in highlands, because the lowlands were already populated by Germans and native gaúchos. The Italian established many vineyards in the region. Nowadays, the wine produced in these areas of Italian colonization in southern Brazil is much appreciated within the country, though little is available for export. In 1875, the first Italian colonies were established in Santa Catarina, which lies immediately to the north of Rio Grande do Sul. The colonies gave rise to towns such as Criciúma, and later also spread further north, to Paraná.

A significant number of Poles have settled in Southern Brazil. The first immigrants arrived in 1869 and until 1959, it is estimated that over 100,000 Poles migrated to Brazil, 95% of whom were peasants. The State of Paraná received the majority of Polish immigrants, who settled mainly in the region of Curitiba, in the towns of Mallet, Cruz Machado, São Matheus do Sul, Irati, and União da Vitória.

Southeast
The Southeastern region of Brazil is the most ethnically diverse part of the country. Europeans make up 55.16% of its population, those of mixed-race 35.69%, and African descent 7.91%. It has the largest percentage of Asian Brazilians, composing 0.8%, and a small Amerindian community (0.2%).

Southeast Brazil is home to the oldest Portuguese village in the Americas, São Vicente, São Paulo, established in 1532. The region, since the beginning of its colonization, is a melting pot of Africans, Natives, and Europeans. The Indigenous peoples of the region were enslaved by the Portuguese.

The race mixing between the indigenous females and their European masters produced the Bandeirante, the colonial inhabitant of São Paulo, who formed expeditions that crossed the interior of Brazil and greatly increased the Portuguese colonial territory. The main language spoken by these people of mixed Indian/Portuguese heritage was Língua geral, a language that mixed Tupi and Portuguese words.

In the late 17th century the Bandeirantes found gold in the area that nowadays is Minas Gerais. A gold rush took place in Brazil and thousands of Portuguese colonists arrived during this period. The confrontation between the Bandeirantes and the Portuguese for obtaining possession of the mines led to the Emboabas' War.

The Portuguese won the war. The Amerindian culture declined, giving space to a stronger Portuguese cultural domination. In order to control the wealth, the Portuguese Crown moved the capital of Brazil from Salvador, Bahia to Rio de Janeiro. Thousands of African slaves were brought to work in the gold mines.

They were landed in Rio de Janeiro and sent to other regions. By the late 18th century, Rio de Janeiro was an "African city": most of its inhabitants were slaves. No other place in the world had as many slaves since the end of the Roman Empire. In 1808 the Portuguese Royal Family, fleeing from Napoleon, took charge in Rio de Janeiro. Some 15,000 Portuguese nobles moved to Brazil. The region changed a lot, becoming more European.

After independence and principally after 1850, Southeast Brazil was "inundated" by European immigrants, who were attracted by the government to replace the African slaves in the coffee plantations. Most immigrants landed in the Port of Santos and have been forwarded to the coffee farms within São Paulo.

The vast majority of the immigrants came from Italy. Brazil attracted nearly 5 million immigrants between 1870 and 1953. The large number of Italians are visible in many parts of Southeast Brazil. Their descendants are nowadays predominant in many areas. For example, Northeast São Paulo is 45% Italian.

The arrival of immigrants from several parts of Europe, the Middle-East and Asia produced an ethnically diverse population. The city of Bastos, in São Paulo, is 11.4% Japanese. The city of São Paulo is home to the largest Japanese population outside Japan itself.

Northeast

The population of Northeast Brazil is a result of an intensive race mixing, which has occurred in the region for more than four centuries. According to the 2006 census people reported as "Pardo" (Multiracial) make up 62.5% of the population. Those reported as African account for 7.8%.

This region did not have much effect from the massive European immigration that took place in Southern Brazil in the late 19th century and first decades of the 20th century. The Northeast has been a poorer region of Brazil since the decline of sugar cane plantations in the late 17th century, so its economy did not require immigrants.

The ethnic composition of the population starts in the 16th century. The Portuguese settlers rarely brought women, which led to relationships with the Indian women. Later, interracial relationships occurred between Portuguese males and African females. The coast, in the past the place where millions of African slaves arrived (mostly from modern-day Angola, Ghana, Nigeria and Benin) to work in sugar-cane plantations, is where nowadays there is a predominance of Mulattoes, those of African and European ancestry. Salvador, Bahia is considered the largest African city outside of Africa, with over 80% of its inhabitants being African-Brazilians. In the interior, there is a predominance of Indian and European mixture.

North

Northern Brazil, largely covered by the Amazon rainforest, is the Brazilian region with the largest Amerindian influences, both in culture and ethnicity. Inhabited by diverse indigenous tribes, this part of Brazil was reached by Portuguese and Spanish colonists in the 17th century, but it started to be populated by non-Indians only in the late 19th and early 20th centuries. The exploitation of rubber used in the growing industries of automobiles, has emerged a huge migration to the region.

Many people from the poor Northeast Brazil, mostly Ceará, moved to the Amazon area. The contact between the Indians and the northeastern rubbers created the base of the ethnic composition of the region, with its mixed-race majority.

Central-West

The Central-West region of Brazil was inhabited by diverse Indians when the Portuguese arrived in the early 18th century. The Portuguese came to explore the precious stones that were found there. Contact between the Portuguese and the Indians created a mixed-race population. Until the mid-20th century, Central-West Brazil had a very small population. The situation changed with the construction of Brasília, the new capital of Brazil, in 1960. Many workers were attracted to the region, mostly from northeastern Brazil.

A new wave of settlers started arriving from the 1970s. With the mechanization of agriculture in the South of Brazil, many rural workers of German and Italian origin migrated to Central-West Brazil. In some areas, they are already the majority of the population.

Education and health

The Federal Constitution of 1988 and the 1996 General Law of Education in Brazil (LDB) attributed to the Federal Government, states, Federal District and municipalities the responsibility of managing the Brazilian educational system, considering three educational public systems as a basis for collaboration between these federal systems.

Each of these public educational systems is responsible for its own maintenance, which manages funds as well as mechanisms and sources for financial resources. The new Constitution reserves 25% of state and municipal taxes and 18% of federal taxes for education.

As set out by the Brazilian Constitution, the main responsibility for basic education is attributed to the states and municipalities. Hence, a historical feature of Brazilian basic education is its extremely decentralized nature, which gives great organizational autonomy to sub-national governments (27 states and 5,546 municipalities) in organizing their educational systems.

Early childhood education, from 0–6 years, is under exclusive responsibility of the municipalities. Responsibility for compulsory primary education from 1st to 9th grades is shared between states and municipalities. Kindergarten and pre-school education are the responsibility of local levels of government, whereas secondary schools are under the responsibility of the states.

Maintenance of the system, including salaries, the definition of teacher career structures and supervision of early childhood, primary, and secondary levels (which make up basic education) is decentralized, and these levels are responsible for defining their respective curriculum content.

Higher education starts with undergraduate or sequential courses, which may offer different specialization choices such as academic or vocational paths. Depending on the choice, students may improve their educational background with Stricto Sensu or Lato Sensu postgraduate courses.

Higher education has three main purposes: teaching, research and extension, each with their own specific contribution to make to a particular course. Diplomas and certificates are proof of having passed through higher education.

According to Brazilian Government, the most serious health problems are:
 Childhood mortality: about 2.51% of childhood mortality, reaching 3.77% in the northeast region.
 Motherhood mortality: about 73.1 deaths per 100,000 born children in 2002.
 Mortality by non-transmissible illness: 151.7 deaths per 100,000 inhabitants caused by heart and circulatory diseases, along with 72.7 deaths per 100,000 inhabitants caused by cancer.
 Mortality caused by external causes (transportation, violence and suicide): 71.7 deaths per 100,000 inhabitants (14.9% of all deaths in the country), reaching 82.3 deaths in the southeast region.

Religion

According to the IBGE census 2010 64.6% are Roman Catholics; 24% are Protestants and other Christians, 8% are agnostics, atheists or have no religion, 2% are followers of Spiritism, and 1% are members of other religions. Some of these religions are Jehovah's Witnesses (1,100,000), Latter-day Saints (200,000), Buddhism (215,000), Judaism (86,000), and Islam (27,000).

Brazil has the largest Roman Catholic population in the world.

Followers of Protestantism are rising in number. Until 1970, the majority of Brazilian Protestants were adherents of "traditional churches", mostly Lutherans, Presbyterians and Baptists. There are 120,000 Episcopalians in 9 dioceses (Anglican Episcopal Church of Brazil). Since then, numbers of Pentecostal and Neopentecostal adherents have increased significantly.

Islam in Brazil was first practiced by African slaves. The Muslim population in Brazil is made up mostly of Arab immigrants.

The largest population of Buddhists in Latin America lives in Brazil, due greatly to Brazil's large Japanese population.

Languages

Portuguese is the only official language of Brazil. It is spoken by nearly the entire population and is virtually the only language used in schools, newspapers, radio, TV and for all business and administrative purposes. Moreover, Brazil is the only Portuguese-speaking nation in the Americas, making the language an important part of Brazilian national identity.

Many Amerindian languages are spoken daily in indigenous communities, primarily in Northern Brazil. Although many of these communities have significant contact with Portuguese, there are incentives stimulating preservation and the teaching of native languages. According to SIL International, 133 Native American languages are currently endangered. Some of the largest indigenous language groups include Arawak, Carib, Macro-Gê and Tupi. In 2006, the City of São Gabriel da Cachoeira in the region of Cabeça do Cachorro (Northwestern region of the State of Amazonas), has adopted some indigenous languages as some of its other official languages along with Portuguese.

Other languages are spoken by descendants of immigrants, who are usually bilingual, in small rural communities in Southern Brazil. The most important are the Brazilian German dialects, such as Riograndenser Hunsrückisch and the East Pomeranian dialect, and also the Talian, based on the Italian Venetian language. There are also bilingual speakers of Polish, Ukrainian and Russian in Southern Brazil, especially Paraná. In the city of São Paulo, Levantine, Japanese, Chinese and Korean can be heard in the immigrant neighborhoods, such as Liberdade. Yiddish and Hebrew are used by Jewish communities mainly in São Paulo, Rio de Janeiro, Porto Alegre, Curitiba, Brasília, Belo Horizonte and Recife as well as the Vlax Romani dialect by Romani  communities all across the nation.

The World Factbook demographic statistics 
The following demographic statistics are from The World Factbook, unless otherwise indicated

Nationality
noun: Brazilian(s)
adjective: Brazilian

Population
  211,715,973

Languages
Portuguese (official)

Ethnic groups
European | mainly Portuguese 47.7%
Caboclo, Castizo 22.3%
Mulatto, Quadroon, Octoroon 20.1% 
Black Brazilians 7.6%
Asian (mainly Japanese) 1.1%
Indigenous  0.4%
Romani  0.4%
Eurasian, Hafu 0.3%

Literacy
Total population: 92.6%
Male: 92.2%
Female: 92.9% (2015 est.)

Religions
Roman Catholic 64.6%
Other Catholic 0.4%
Protestant 22.2% 
Adventist (including Seventh-day Adventist and Adventist Church of Promise) 6.5%
Assembly of God 2.0%
Christian Congregation of Brazil 1.2%
Universal Church of the Kingdom of God 1.0%
Other Protestant 11.5%
Other Christian 0.7%
Spiritist 2.2%
Other 1.4%
None 8%
Unspecified 0.4%

See also
Brazil
2022 Brazilian Census
Race and ethnicity in Brazil
Demographics of Rio de Janeiro
List of largest cities in Brazil
Racial democracy
Brazilian Journal of Population Studies

References

External links
 United Nations "World Population Prospects": Country Profile – Brazil
 Population Statistics for Brazil
 Build Brazil population graph 1960 – 2013 (World Bank data)
 Build Brazil population projection graph till 2100 (United Nation data)
 Build Brazil life expectancy at birth graph 1950 – 2013 (United Nation data)

 
Brazil